Tulare Lake, in the southern San Joaquin Valley in California, United States, had at various points in its history prior to 1880 an archipelago in the southern portion of the lake. Since the lake shore largely varied with the season (from rainfall and snowmelt from the Sierras), there is a wide variety of names attested for the islands. Today, these former islands make up the Sand Ridge in Kings County and are the traditional territory of the Wowol people.

Islands

Atwell Island
Atwell Island was originally known Hog-Root Island or Root Island. It was owned by Judge Atwell of Visalia, California who introduced hogs onto the island. In early historical times, it was the site of the Wowol village Chawlolwin. Today the city of Alpaugh, California sits on the remnants of Atwell Island. Atwell Island was the largest of the Tulare Lake archipelago and has the latest recorded habitation by indigenous peoples.

Gull Island
Gull Island was a small islet at the mouth of the Tule River.

This island extends westward into the lake from the south bank of Tule River. It is a narrow bar now forming a small island like Pelican Island at the mouth of King's River. As the lake surface falls, this bar is forming quite an island, though it is yet low, muddy, and without vegetation. On it may be seen many pelicans and large numbers of gulls, and from the latter, gave it the name of "Gull Island." It should be remembered that this and "Pelican Island" are now the only genuine islands on all the broad surface of Tulare Lake, and they are so narrow and flat as scarcely to deserve the name.

Gull Island is similar in etymology to the Pelican Island, in that it was named after the fauna of the region.

Bird Island
Bird Island is attested in a single 1876 map which shows a small, oblate island at the tip of Atwell Island's 'teardrop' shape.
 It is unclear if this island is the same as Gull Island.

Pelican Islands
Two islands are attested with the name Pelican Island or Pelican Islands. The earlier name is associated with a series of three long, skinny islands to the east of Atwell's Island. The later name signifies a site 10 miles north of the older Pelican Islands, in the historical Tulare Lake bed. It received its name from the vast number of white pelicans that nested on it.

This is a low, narrow strip of land in Tulare Lake, totally bare of vegetation as yet, and is a bar formed by the deposits of King's River as an extension of the east bank of its east channel. It is a mile long, or more, from ten to sixty feet wide, and not more than a foot or eighteen inches at any point above the present lake surface. On this long, narrow, bare island thousands of our common white pelicans, and, associated with them on the best of terms, and also nesting, were hundreds of that one of two species of pacific coast cormorants, known as Brandt's cormorant.

Skull Island
Skull Island extended between five and six miles and was just over half a mile wide, the highest part being about twenty feet above the lakebed. It was at the west end of the Sand Ridge, so it was probably part of the above Pelican Islands.

Skull Island is one of the more locally famous landmarks, being associated with legends of an "Indian battle" in the region that left a massive burial ground on the west end of the Pelican Islands. Frank F. Latta identifies it with the Calaveres  of the early Spanish settlers but is unclear on where this name is attested in primary sources.

Yoimut (referred to in the text as J.A. for Josie Alonzo) recalls a village on or near the site.

Throughout the 19th century it was common for settlers in the Central Valley to raid the site. Frank F. Latta writes that Dr. William Ferguson Cartmill, who numerous streets are named after in Tulare County, took several skulls from the site and kept them in his house, based on the testimony of his son Wooster Cartmill.

Habitation
Despite being discovered by settlers extremely late, perhaps as late as the 1850s, the islands were densely populated by indigenous peoples. A Wowol village on Atwell's Island was named Chawlowin, occupied later than 1852 by refugee Yokuts natives. Yoimut, noted by Frank F. Latta as the last full-blooded Chunut, described semi-traditional life at Chawlowin:

My mother found almost all of her relations there at Chawlowin. Her brother had his family there and two or three of her uncles were there, too. They had all come back to that camp from Tule River Reservation, where the soldiers had taken them from Téjon Ranch. They wanted to stay at their old home. These people did not go back to the old village at the mouth of Deer Creek and White River because they would come back and get them. They were hid in the tules in tumlus (toom-loos) houses at the north side of the Island.

Her account further details white settlers introducing cattle to the island and subsequently forcing the indigenous people out:

While we were at Chawlolwin some white men put cattle on the island. The water was low and they drove them across from the east. There were hogs there already, but they were wild. As soon as the white people found out we were there we began to have trouble. The tules were getting dry and we were afraid the white people would burn us out. So we all left. My mother and stepfather took us to Téjon Ranch. We went in his brother's little wagon.

This sort of attitude towards indigenous peoples was characteristic of white settlers, only a couple of decades removed from the California Genocide. Yoimut died in Hanford, CA in the 1930s.

Geology and ecology

Geologically the archipelago was a Tulare Lake sandspit. In times of exceptionally high water, the islands formed a natural bridge which separated the northern Tachi and southern Ton Tachi lakes. Sand Ridge is a series of sand dunes, seven to eight miles long that spans west from present-day Alpaugh.

Flora

Native ecosystems of the region ranged from saltbrush scrub and alkali sink to valley grassland and wetland. Tule reed was of historical importance and provided shelter, food, and transportation (via reed boats) to the Wowol nation, and indeed gave the region its name. Today alfalfa is grown on some parts of the Sand Ridge and invasive saltcedar is recorded in natural habitats.

Fauna

Indigenous fauna of the Sand Ridge area include Buena Vista Lake shrew (Sorex ornatus relictus), southwestern pond turtle (Actinemys pallida), fulvous whistling-duck (Dendrocygna bicolor), least bittern (Ixobrychus exilis), California red-legged frog (Rana aurora draytonii) and giant garter snake (Thamnophis gigas). Other species native or present in the area are sandhill cranes and tricolored blackbird. Historically attested species (sometimes present in nearby placenames) like the tule elk and pronghorn antelope were of economic importance to Native American peoples living in the area. Grizzly Adams hunted tule elk on Pelican Island in the 1850s.

History
The Tulare Lake region has been continually inhabited for more than 10,000 years. The Witt site, on the shores of Tulare Lake, yields paleolithic artifacts of concave points, crescents, and fossilized elephant, bison, and horse bones. The Sand Ridge area in particular has been occupied since at least the late Pleistocene. According to the Bureau of Land Management, Sand Ridge "has yielded artifacts spanning the entire cultural horizon in California."

Pestilence of 1833
Local legend holds of a great "Indian battle" that took place at Skull Island. However, it is far more likely that the mass grave on Skull Island was due to an epidemic, probably smallpox.

Latta notes that his Yokuts informants attest to a pestilence around 1833 that wiped out large portions of the western San Joaquin Valley:

 At least three centenarians among my Yokuts informants were children here at that time. They were able to verify the existence of such an occurrence and to give me some account of it: burial of dead bodies until there were not enough survivors to make burials; abandonment of village sites, fleeing to the mountains, and later, studying the general condition of the valley floor and foothills until the Mewalk  them safe for reoccupation. These centarians were Pahmit, San Joaquin River Dumna; Sahn-e-hat, Tule River Yaudanche, and To-tu-yah, Yosemite Valley Mewalk. Totuyah and Pahmit actually knew of the Mewalk moving down into the vacant Yokuts territory.

Early cartography
The Sand Ridge landform, which is the remnants of what was once the Tulare Lake archipelago, was the densest region of human habitation for hundreds of years because it provided stable land to build villages on, unlike the shores of Tulare Lake, which varied with the seasons. In times of low water, the Sand Ridge split Tulare Lake in two, the latter becoming the Tache and Ton Tache lakes. 
The islands were probably discovered by settlers in the 1850s.

An 1853 map depicts the Sand Ridge region as a 'ridge of high ground' and not as islands. An 1854 map, however, depicts a 
natural road 500 ft. across' which separates the lake in two.

Grizzly Adams visits Tulare Lake
In 1854, Grizzly Adams hunted on Pelican Island, "where there was said to be elk in abundance." Children from a village on the mouth of the Kings River guided him to the island on a canoe made of tules.

Final years
From 1875 to 1877, large numbers of hogs and cattle were carried to Skull Island from the mainland on the Mose Andross.

The islands were permanently part of the mainland by 1886.

Pelicans return to Pelican Island
At several points local newspapers in the valley have reported that pelicans have returned to Pelican Island.

Timeline
 1804: Fray Juan Martin crosses the Sand Ridge
 1814: Cabot expedition visits Wowol villages on the Sand Ridge.
 1830s: Proposed date of an "Indian battle" which led to the formation of the burial ground on Skull Island
 1833: The Pestilence of 1833, "certainly introduced by whites," wipes out huge swathes of Yokuts in the Central Valley.
 1850s: Supposed 'discovery' by settler cattlemen. Dr. William Ferguson Cartmill visits the island on horseback sometime during this decade.
 Between 1860 and 1870: Latest report of a living Wowol village on the island.
 1870s: Jose Messa makes several trips to the island. 
 1875–1877: The schooner Mose Andross carries hogs to the island and the islands in the adjacent area
 1879?: James W. A. Wright, a Princeton graduate and former captain in the Confederate Army, boards the Water Witch and reports visiting Skull Island, which still had exposed bones
 By 1882: Islands permanently connected to mainland.

See also
 Tulare Lake
 Alpaugh

References

Tulare Basin watershed
Endorheic lakes of California
Former lakes of the United States
San Joaquin Valley
Wetlands of California
History of the San Joaquin Valley
Landforms of Kings County, California
Geography of the San Joaquin Valley
Natural history of the Central Valley (California)
Kern River
Yokuts